In taxonomy, Halovivax is a genus of the Natrialbaceae. Some species of Halovivax are halophiles and have been found in Iran's Aran-Bidgol hypersaline lake.

References

Further reading

Scientific journals

Scientific books

Scientific databases

External links

Archaea genera
Euryarchaeota
Taxa described in 2006